Ethiopic is a Unicode block containing characters for writing the Geʽez, Tigrinya, Amharic, Tigre, Harari, Gurage and other Ethiosemitic languages and Central Cushitic languages or Agaw languages.

Block

History
The following Unicode-related documents record the purpose and process of defining specific characters in the Ethiopic block:

References 

Unicode blocks